The 2019 VTV Cup is the 16th staging of the international tournament. The tournament will held in Quảng Nam, Vietnam.

Pool composition

Preliminary round 
All times are local: Vietnam Standard Time (UTC+07:00).

Group A 

|}

|}

Group B 

|}

|}

Final round 
All times are local: Vietnam Standard Time (UTC+07:00).

Final six

Quarterfinals 

|}

Semifinals 

|}

6th place 

|}

5th place 

|}

3rd place 

|}

Final 

|}

Final standing

Awards
Most Valuable Player
 Mizuki Yanagita
Best Outside Spikers
 Kim Hyon-ju
 Jong Jin-sim
Best Setter
 Shiori Tsukada
Best Opposite Spiker
 Đặng Thị Kim Thanh
Best Middle Blockers
 Bùi Thị Ngà
 Shiori Aratani
Best Libero
 Manami Kojima
Miss VTV Cup 2019
 Dinara Syzdykova

References

VTV International Women's Volleyball Cup
2019 in women's volleyball